Mâtnicu may refer to several places in Romania:

 Mâtnicu Mare, a village in Constantin Daicoviciu Commune, Caraş-Severin County
 Mâtnicu Mic, a village in Fârdea Commune, Timiș County